Jakob Rosbach Larsen (born 4 July 1974) is a Greenlandic/Danish retired handball player and current manager of the Danish club Nykøbing Falster Håndboldklub, where he has coached since 2017. He has previously been the manager of GOG Gudme. Larsen became Danish champion, as player, with GOG in 2007. He has a Master of Science degree in sport sciences from the University of Southern Denmark.

Career
Larsen played for four years for the Danish club, Nyborg GIF Håndbold, moving to the Danish Handball League at GOG. He played to season with GOG before moving to Otterup HK in the 2000–201 season. The Spanish side Zaragoza noticed Jakob Larsen during the 2001 World Championship in a match against Spain and Larsen was sold to Zaragoza in February 2001.

Larsen returned to Denmark that same year and joined a local club in Odense in order to combine handball and his studies. He later rejoined GOG. In 2004, he signed with the French side Saint-Raphaël Var Handball, playing for two seasons with the club. In 2006, he returned to GOG and played until the club's bankruptcy in 2010. In all, Larsen won two Danish championships with GOG. He played the following two season for Faaborg HK on an amateur contract before starting his career as a trainer.

References

1974 births
Living people
Greenlandic male handball players
Greenlandic people of Danish descent
Greenlandic emigrants to Denmark
People from Qeqqata
University of Southern Denmark alumni